Anna Alexandrovna Milenina (née Burmistrova; born 15 July 1986) is a Russian Paralympic biathlete and cross-country skier. She was born with Erb's palsy which resulted in her left arm being paralyzed.

She was named Honoured Master of Sport for her efforts at the 2010 Paralympic Games.

Achievements

Gold – 2006 Winter Paralympics (skiing, 10 km.)
Silver – 2006 Winter Paralympics (skiing, 15 km.)
Silver – 2006 Winter Paralympics (skiing, 5 km.)
Silver – 2006 Winter Paralympics (biathlon, 7,5 km.)
Gold – 2009 Russian Championships (5 km)
Gold – 2009 World Cup
Gold – 2010 Winter Paralympics ( biathlon, 3 km ind. pursuit)
Gold – 2010 Winter Paralympics ( skiing, 15 km FREE.)
Silver – 2010 Winter Paralympics (biathlon, 12.5 km.)

References

External links 

 

1986 births
Living people
People from Krasnoturyinsk
Paralympic biathletes of Russia
Paralympic cross-country skiers of Russia
Biathletes at the 2010 Winter Paralympics
Cross-country skiers at the 2010 Winter Paralympics
Paralympic gold medalists for Russia
Paralympic bronze medalists for Russia
Biathletes at the 2014 Winter Paralympics
Medalists at the 2006 Winter Paralympics
Medalists at the 2010 Winter Paralympics
Medalists at the 2014 Winter Paralympics
Russian female biathletes
Biathletes at the 2018 Winter Paralympics
Cross-country skiers at the 2018 Winter Paralympics
Medalists at the 2018 Winter Paralympics
Paralympic medalists in cross-country skiing
Paralympic medalists in biathlon
Sportspeople from Sverdlovsk Oblast
20th-century Russian women
21st-century Russian women